Three motor vessels operated by the British Tanker Company were named British Diplomat

, in service until 1940, requisitioned by the Ministry of War Transport and renamed Empire Diplomat. Scrapped in 1946
, built by Doxfords

Ship names